Carlos Alberto Lourenço Cardoso (born 29 December 1944) is a former Portuguese footballer who played as a defender and manager.

Cardoso's playing career say him play only for his boyhood club of Vitória de Setúbal between 1964 until 1977. Cardoso the Setúbal's side who the Taça de Portugal in the 1964–65 and 1966–67 seasons.

Cardoso has managed Vitória de Setúbal on four different spells, with the most recent being in 2009.

References

External links
 
 

1944 births
Living people
Sportspeople from Setúbal
Portuguese footballers
Association football defenders
Primeira Liga players
Vitória F.C. players
Portugal international footballers
Portuguese football managers
Primeira Liga managers
C.D. Nacional managers
Juventude Sport Clube managers
Vitória F.C. managers